Eastbound & Down is an American sports comedy television series that was broadcast on HBO, and created by Ben Best, Jody Hill, and Danny McBride. It stars McBride as Kenny Powers, a former professional baseball pitcher who, after a career downturn in the major leagues, is forced to return to his hometown middle school in Shelby, North Carolina, as a substitute physical education teacher.

Producers Will Ferrell and Adam McKay received an order for six episodes for the first season from HBO. The series was produced by Ferrell's production company, Gary Sanchez Productions. The show premiered February 15, 2009. Its second season, consisting of seven episodes, began on September 26, 2010. On October 27, HBO announced it was renewing the show for a third season. At PaleyFest 2011, it was announced that the third season, which premiered on February 19, 2012, would be the last. In July 2012, HBO picked up the comedy series for a fourth season of eight episodes.

On June 6, 2013, HBO announced that the fourth season would be the show's last. The fourth season premiered on September 29, 2013, and ended its run on November 17, 2013.

Plot
Years after he turned his back on his hometown, a burned-out major league ballplayer who "forced himself into retirement by the depths of his own jerkiness" returns to teach physical education at his old middle school. Still trying to reclaim his fame he starts on a comeback—righting his previous wrongs along the way—only to unwittingly sabotage his own efforts.

While not based on the life of former Major League Baseball relief pitcher John Rocker, the show's creators do cite Rocker's attitude as an inspiration. Former major league pitcher Mitch "Wild Thing" Williams has often been cited as the inspiration for the Powers character, though Williams himself has disavowed any connection. Explaining the tone of the show, McBride has stated that he and his fellow co-creators had intended to "make fun of a South where you could learn an ancient martial art like Tae Kwon Do in a shopping center next to a tanning salon.”

Cast

Main cast
 Danny McBride as Kenny Powers
 Steve Little as Steven Bernard "Stevie" Janowski
 Katy Mixon as April Buchanon (seasons 1 & 4, recurring seasons 2–3)
 John Hawkes as Dustin Powers (season 1, recurring seasons 2–4)
 Jennifer Irwin as Cassie Powers (season 1, recurring seasons 2–4)
 Andy Daly as Terrence Cutler (season 1, recurring seasons 2–3)
 Ben Best as Clegg (season 1, recurring season 2)
 Elizabeth De Razzo as Maria Janowski (seasons 2–4)
 Ana de la Reguera as Vida (season 2)
 Michael Peña as Sebastian Cisneros (season 2)
 Marco Rodríguez as Roger Hernandez (season 2)
 Efren Ramirez as Catuey (season 2)
 Ken Marino as Guy Young (season 4)
 Tim Heidecker as Gene (season 4)
 Jillian Bell as Dixie (season 4)

Recurring cast
 Adam Scott as Pat Anderson (seasons 1–2)
 Will Ferrell as Ashley Schaeffer (season 1, season 3)
 Craig Robinson as Reg Mackworthy (season 1, season 3)
 Sylvia Jefferies as Tracy (seasons 1–2)
 Bo Mitchell as Wayne Powers (seasons 1–4)
 Ethan Alexander McGee as Dustin Powers Jr. (seasons 1-4)
 Don Johnson as Eduardo Sanchez Powers (seasons 2–3)
 Marlene Forte as Soledad Sanchez (season 2)
 Erick Chavarria as Casper (seasons 2–3)
 Matthew McConaughey as Roy McDaniel (seasons 2–3)
 Jerry Minor as Jamie Laing (seasons 2–4)
 Deep Roy as Aaron (season 2)
 Joaquin Cosío as Hector (season 2)
 Eduardo "Piolín" Sotelo as Announcer (season 2)
 Alex ter Avest as Andrea (season 3)
 Jason Sudeikis as Shane Gerald/Cole Gerald (season 3)
 Jon Michael Hill as Darnell (season 3)
 Ike Barinholtz as Ivan Dochenko (season 3)
 Lily Tomlin as Tammy Powers (season 3)
 Jon Reep as Jed Forney (season 4)
 Omar Dorsey as Dontel Benjamin (season 4)

Episodes

Production
Production on the second season of the show began in May 2010.  The setting moved to Mexico, with shooting actually occurring in Gurabo, Puerto Rico.  The new season brought several changes to the cast, including new faces Michael Peña and Ana de la Reguera, who play the owner of a Mexican baseball team and Kenny's new love interest, respectively.  Don Johnson appeared in the role of Kenny's father, whom Kenny and Stevie managed to track down in Mexico.  All of the supporting cast from the first season are absent or only make cameo appearances, with the only exception being Steve Little as Stevie Janowski, who follows Kenny to Mexico.  Ben Best is not a writer for Season 2 but returns in a small role as Clegg. Adam Scott returns in two episodes as the now cocaine-free baseball executive Pat Anderson.

Actor Deep Roy joined the cast as Aaron, one of Kenny's new Mexican sidekicks. The Mexican baseball team owned by Peña's character Sebastian Cisneros, the Charros, is coached by Roger Hernandez, played by actor Marco Rodriguez. Co-director Jody Hill described the season as "a cross between the films Amores perros and The Bad News Bears". Hill directed four episodes in season two, while David Gordon Green directed three.

Season 2 premiered on September 26, 2010. Vice magazine reported on August 31, 2010 that "it's worthy of the original and is its own different, more somber beast." The writers had considered setting the second season in America; according to McBride, "at one point, we considered opening on a shot of the big sombrero at South of the Border, so you think Kenny’s in Mexico. And then he would have said [voice-over tone], ‘I went down to the butthole of the Carolinas.’ [laughs] We actually thought about setting the entire season in Myrtle Beach instead of in Mexico. I gotta say, the Myrtle Beach idea was pretty brilliant. It would have really been something. Maybe he ends up there next season. [beat] Who knows?"

Season 3 saw Jason Sudeikis join the cast, and the returns of Matthew McConaughey as Texas scout Roy McDaniel, and Will Ferrell who reprised his role as car salesman Ashley Schaeffer. Ike Barinholtz also joined the cast as Ivan, a Russian pitcher who serves as Kenny's competition. The show was filmed in Myrtle Beach, South Carolina at TicketReturn.com Field and features Kenny as a member of a minor league baseball team called Myrtle Beach Mermen.

Reception
Eastbound & Down was met with positive reviews during its run. On Rotten Tomatoes, the first season of the show has a rating of 60%, based on 15 reviews, with an average rating of 7.3/10. The site's consensus reads, "Eastbound & Down might be too profane and obnoxious for some, but its broad humor and irreverent vibe make for some great comic moments." Metacritic gave season 1 a "generally favorable" average score of 62 out of 100, based 16 critics, and seasons 2 and 3 scores of 89 and 83 out of 100, respectively, both indicating "universal acclaim". The fourth and final season of the show holds a perfect 100% rating on Rotten Tomatoes, based on 11 critics.

International syndication

HBO has syndicated Eastbound & Down to many international markets.

References

External links

 Official U.S. website
 Official UK website
 

2000s American single-camera sitcoms
2010s American single-camera sitcoms
2009 American television series debuts
2013 American television series endings
American sports television series
Baseball on television in the United States
Baseball television series
English-language television shows
HBO original programming
Television series by Gary Sanchez Productions
Television shows filmed in North Carolina
Television shows filmed in Wilmington, North Carolina
Television shows filmed in South Carolina
Television shows set in Mexico
Television shows set in North Carolina
Television shows set in South Carolina
Television series created by Danny McBride